Mindy Thomas is an American children's author and podcast host. In 2017, Thomas launched NPR's science-for-kids podcast Wow in the World with journalist Guy Raz. Thomas also hosts the Gracie Award-winning Absolutely Mindy Show on Sirius XM and Highlights Hangout with Highlights magazine

Personal life 
Thomas was raised in Dayton, Ohio, and later in Florida. Thomas graduated from the University of South Florida (USF) with a degree in Mass Communications.

Books 
 Two Whats?! and a Wow! Think & Tinker Playbook: Activities and Games for Curious Kids (2020), Houghton Mifflin Harcourt.
 Wow in the World, the How and Wow of the Human Body (2021), Clarion Books (an imprint of HarperCollins).
 Wow in the Wild: The Amazing World of Animals (2022), Clarion Books (an imprint of HarperCollins).

References 

American podcasters
American children's writers
Year of birth missing (living people)
Living people